The Listening is the debut album of North Carolina trio Little Brother. It was released in early 2003 on ABB Records.

Overview 

As the main producer for the group, 9th Wonder's instrumentals consist of chopped and manipulated samples of old soul records, reminiscent of Pete Rock and DJ Premier. Complementing the backdrops are MC's Phonte and Rapper Big Pooh with their tag-team wordplay and raps. On "Speed", they rap about the pressures of working a regular job while trying to survive in the rat race, while on "Make Me Hot", they make fun of people who hassle them for beats and studio time. They also do some uncanny impressions of old school era MC's on "So Fabulous".

The underlying theme of The Listening concerns the group's effort to engage their listeners on a deeper level, and their frustration at casual listeners who pay little attention to lyrics and content and simply want to hear a "hot song".  The interludes are performed by the members of a fictional radio station called WJLR (Justus League Radio).  On the last song, "The Listening", the group addresses the album's main theme directly: they abruptly stop the song, exchange dialogue, then restart.

Reception

AllMusic generally praised the album, concluding that it "a finely crafted musical document, composed by artists who want nothing more than to provide even just a glimpse of hip-hop purity within an ever-expanding maze of cultural deterioration." HipHopDX praised the album's consistent quality, in that the music worked best in the album format, and the message was lessened when the listener skipped tracks.

Track listing

References

Little Brother (group) albums
2003 debut albums
Albums produced by 9th Wonder